Flexoelectricity is a property of a dielectric material whereby it exhibits a spontaneous electrical polarization induced by a strain gradient. Flexoelectricity is closely related to piezoelectricity, but while piezoelectricity refers to polarization due to uniform strain, flexoelectricity refers specifically to polarization due to strain that changes from point to point in the material. This nonuniform strain breaks centrosymmetry, meaning that unlike in piezoelectiricty, flexoelectric effects can occur in centrosymmetric crystal structures. Flexoelectricity is not the same as Ferroelasticity. 
Inverse flexoelectricity, quite intuitively can be defined as generation of strain gradient due to polarization. Similarly extending on that, Converse flexoelectricity would refer to the process where a polarization gradient induces strain in a material.

The electric polarization due to mechanical stress in a dielectric is given by

where the first term corresponds to the direct piezoelectric effect and the second term corresponds to the flexoelectric polarization induced by the strain gradient.

See also 
 Piezoelectricity
 Ferroelectricity
 Ferroelasticity

References

External links 
 Introduction to Flexoelectricity 

Electric and magnetic fields in matter
Condensed matter physics